Senakunja is the official auditoriam / convention centre of Bangladesh Armed Forces and is located in Dhaka Cantonment. The venue holds official events of Bangladesh Armed Forces. as well as used for wedding ceremonies and other social gatherings.

History
The Annual Armed Forces Day is held here on 21 November to commemorate the establishment of Bangladesh military in 1971 during Bangladesh Liberation war. The venue also holds an annual Iftar party hosted by Bangladesh Armed Forces and attended by the elite of Bangladesh.

References

Buildings and structures in Dhaka
Bangladesh Army